Heard It All Before may refer to:

 Heard It All Before (album), 1999 album by Jamie Cullum
 "Heard It All Before" (Sunshine Anderson song), 2001
 Heard It All Before (Dinah Jane song)
 Heard It All Before: Live at the Hi Fi Bar, 2007 album by Clutch